Datuan may refer to these towns in China:

Datuan, Shandong, in Rongcheng, Shandong
Datuan, Shanghai